Baritius brunnea is a moth of the family Erebidae first described by George Hampson in 1901. It is found in the Amazon region.

References

Phaegopterina
Moths described in 1901